Eleanor Anne Maguire  (born 27 March 1970) is an Irish neuroscientist. Since 2007, she has been Professor of Cognitive Neuroscience at University College London where she is also a Wellcome Trust Principal Research Fellow.

Early life and education
Maguire was born in Dublin, Ireland. She studied psychology at University College Dublin and graduated with a Bachelor of Arts (BA Hons) degree in 1990. She studied Clinical and experimental neuropsychology at University of Wales, Swansea and graduated with a Master of Science degree in 1991. She undertook her Doctor of Philosophy (PhD) degree at University College Dublin, Ireland, where she first became interested in the neural basis of memory while working with patients as a neuropsychologist at Beaumont Hospital, Dublin. She completed her PhD in 1994, and her doctoral thesis was titled Real-world spatial memory following temporal-lobe surgery in humans.

Research and career 
Maguire is a Wellcome Trust Principal Research Fellow and Professor of Cognitive Neuroscience at the Wellcome Trust Centre for Neuroimaging at University College London, UK, where she is also the Deputy Director. Maguire heads the Memory and Space research laboratory at the Centre. In addition, she is an honorary member of the Department of Neuropsychology, National Hospital for Neurology and Neurosurgery, Queen Square, London.

Maguire and others have noted that a distributed set of brain regions supports human episodic (autobiographical) memory, defined as the memory for personal everyday events, and that this brain network overlaps considerably with that supporting navigation in large-scale space and other diverse cognitive functions such as imagination and thinking about the future. In her research Maguire seeks to place episodic memory in the context of wider cognition so as to understand how common brain areas, and possibly common processes, support such disparate functions. In this way she hopes to gain novel and fundamental insights into the mechanisms that are involved.

Her team uses standard whole brain and high resolution structural and functional magnetic resonance imaging in conjunction with behavioural testing and neuropsychological examination of amnesic patients to pursue their aims. They mainly employ ecologically valid or 'real life' experimental paradigms to examine brain-behaviour relationships; examples include using virtual reality to examine navigation, investigating autobiographical memories of people's personal past experiences, and their ability to imagine fictitious and future scenes and events. Perhaps the most famous of these is her series of studies on London taxi drivers, where she documented changes in hippocampal structure associated with acquiring the knowledge of London's layout. A redistribution of grey matter was indicated in London Taxi Drivers compared to controls. This work on hippocampal plasticity not only interested scientists, but also engaged the public and media world-wide.

This is also true of her other work such as that showing that patients with amnesia cannot imagine the future which several years ago was rated as one of the scientific breakthroughs of the year; and her other studies demonstrating that it is possible to decode people's memories from the pattern of fMRI activity in the hippocampus.

Maguire's interest is mainly focused on the hippocampus, a brain structure known to be crucial for learning and memory, whilst also exploring the roles of the parahippocampal cortex, the retrosplenial cortex and the ventromedial prefrontal cortex. She has supervised numerous doctoral students including Demis Hassabis.

Public engagement 
Besides her direct scientific activities, Maguire and her research group have an active public engagement agenda, involving public lectures, school visits and demonstrations, TV, radio and internet contributions, and collaborations with several artists, encouraging people of all ages to think about the value of science in their everyday lives. In February 2014, Maguire delivered a Friday Evening Discourse at The Royal Institution.

Honours and awards
Maguire has won a number of prizes for outstanding contributions to science, including:
2003, the Ig Nobel Prize for Medicine, awarded for 'presenting evidence that the brains of London taxi drivers are more highly developed than those of their fellow citizens'
 the Cognitive Neuroscience Society Young Investigator Award
2008, the Royal Society Rosalind Franklin Award
 The Feldberg Foundation Prize
 The IBRO-Kemali Prize
 UCD Alumnus of the Year in Research, Innovation and Impact 2016

She was also named as one of 'Twenty Europeans who have changed our lives’ when The European Union launched a new science and innovation initiative several years ago. In 2011, Maguire was elected a Fellow of the Academy of Medical Sciences (FMedSci) and, in 2016, a Fellow of the Royal Society (FRS).   

In 2017 she was elected an Honorary Member of the Royal Irish Academy (MRIA) and in July 2018 was elected Fellow of the British Academy (FBA).

Personal life
Maguire's entry in Who's Who lists her recreations as "Comedy lover, long-suffering supporter of Crystal Palace Football Club, getting lost."

References 

1970 births
Living people
Scientists from Dublin (city)
Alumni of University College London
Academics of University College London
Irish neurologists
Neuropsychologists
Irish women neuroscientists
Fellows of the Royal Society
Female Fellows of the Royal Society
Wellcome Trust Principal Research Fellows
Fellows of the British Academy
Members of the Royal Irish Academy
British cognitive neuroscientists
Neuroimaging researchers
20th-century women scientists
21st-century women scientists